Delayed Gratification is a quarterly magazine published in the United Kingdom by The Slow Journalism Company. The magazine is an example of the slow movement and is described as 'an antidote to throwaway media'. It covers the news events of the previous three months after the dust has settled. Its slogan is 'last to breaking news'.

The first issue was published in January 2011. The magazine features daily summaries for the quarter covered, plus long-form articles, photo features and infographics on the biggest stories of the period. Each issue features cover art by a different artist. Issue one featured the piece "Freedom Of The Press" by Shepard Fairey. The magazine is edited by Marcus Webb and Rob Orchard.

References

External links 
 Official Delayed Gratification site

Magazines established in 2011
News magazines published in the United Kingdom
Quarterly magazines published in the United Kingdom
Magazines published in London
Slow movement